Harpasa was a city and bishopric in ancient Caria in Roman Asia Minor (Asian Turkey), which only remains a Latin Catholic titular see.

History 
Little is known of the history of this town, situated on the east bank of the Harpasus, a tributary of the Mæander. It is mentioned by Ptolemy, by Stephanus Byzantius, by Hierocles, and by Pliny the Elder. According to Pliny, there was in the neighbourhood a rocking-stone which could be set in motion by a finger-touch, whereas the force of the whole body could not move it.

The Ancient Armenian village that resided in present-day Turkey hosts the ruined castle of Arpaz, in the district of Nazilli, nearly preserves the old name as does the Turkish form Harpaskale.

Bishopric 
It was important enough in the late Roman province of Caria (civil Diocese of Asia) to become a bishopric, a suffragan of the archbishopric of Stauropolis , in the sway of the Patriarchate of Constantinople.
Harpasa appears in the lists of the Notitiae Episcopatuum until the 12th or 13th century.
 
Lequien's Oriens Christianus I, 907 mentions only four historically documented bishops :
 Phinias, who took part in the First Council of Ephesus in 431
 Zoticus, at the Council of Chalcedon 451, ? represented by the presbyter Philotheos
 Irenæus, who adhered the heresy Monophysitism
 Leo, in Constantinople at the Council of Constantinople of 879–880 which rehabilitated Patriarch Photius I of Constantinople.

 Titular see 
The diocese was nominally restored (twentieth century?) by the Catholic Church as Titular bishopric of Harpasa (Latin) / Arpassa (Curiate Italian) / Harpasen(us) (Latin).

It is vacant since decades, having had the following incumbents, so far of the fitting Episcopal (lowest) rank, including an Eastern Catholic :
BIOS TO ELABORATE
 Joseph Pfluger (later Archbishop) (1911.11.30 – 1927.01.29)
 Blessed Bishop Pavel Peter Gojdic, Basilian Order of Saint Josaphat (O.S.B.M. – Byzantine Rite) (1927.03.07 – 1940.04.11)
 Bishop Stanislav Zela (1940.10.11 – 1969.12.06)

References

Sources and external links 
 GCatholic (former &) titular see
VII, New York 1910
Bibliography – ecclesiastical history
 Pius Bonifacius Gams, Series episcoporum Ecclesiae Catholicae, Leipzig 1931, p. 447
 Michel Lequien, Oriens christianus in quatuor Patriarchatus digestus, Paris 1740, vol. I, coll. 907–910
 Vincenzo Ruggiari, A historical Addendum to the episcopal Lists of Caria, in Revue des études byzantines, 1996, Volume 54, No. 54, pp. 221–234 (nptably p. 233)

Catholic titular sees in Asia
Suppressed Roman Catholic dioceses
Populated places in ancient Caria
Former populated places in Turkey
Roman towns and cities in Turkey
Populated places of the Byzantine Empire
History of Aydın Province
Nazilli District